The Real Great Escape is Larry Coryell's eighth album as a leader. The album was released 1973 on the Vanguard label featuring Steve Marcus on saxophone, Mervin Bronson on bass, Mike Mandel on keyboards, Harry Wilkinson on drums. The album peaked number 35 on the Jazz Albums chart.

Track listing
Side one
 "The Real Great Escape" (Larry Coryell) – 7:33
 "Are You Too Clever" (Julie Coryell) – 5:24
 "Love Life's Offering" (Larry Coryell) – 3:21

Side two
 "Makes Me Want To Shout" (Larry Coryell) – 5:23
 "All My Love's Laughter" (Jimmy Webb) – 4:23
 "Scotland II" (Julie Coryell, Larry Coryell) – 5:03
 "P.F. Sloan" (Jimmy Webb) – 4:01

 
Sources: and

Personnel
Adapted from AllMusic and the album's liner notes.

Band
 Mervin Bronson – bass
 Larry Coryell – guitar, ARP synthesizer, vocals
 Mike Mandel – piano, ARP Synthesizer
 Steve Marcus – soprano sax, tenor sax
 Harry Wilkinson – drums

Additional musicians
 Earl DeRouen – congas
 Julie Coryell – additional vocals
 Bryan Wells – horn arrangements

Production
 Joel Brodsky – photography
 Vince Cirrincione – direction
 Tom Paine – direction
 Danny Weiss – producer
 Jeff Zaraya – engineer
 Jules Halfant – art direction and design

Chart performance

References

1973 albums
Larry Coryell albums
Vanguard Records albums
Albums with cover art by Joel Brodsky